Imagine That is a 2009 comedy film starring Eddie Murphy, directed by Karey Kirkpatrick, and written by Ed Solomon and Chris Matheson. It centers on the relationship between a workaholic father (Murphy) and his daughter, Olivia (Yara Shahidi), whose imaginary world becomes the secret to her father's success.

The film had its premiere at the Paramount Theater on the Paramount Studios Lot in Los Angeles, California and was then widely released on June 12, 2009. Murphy was nominated for a Golden Raspberry Award for Worst Actor for his work in the film. The film was a co-production between Paramount Pictures and Nickelodeon Movies. The film received mixed to negative reviews from critics and audiences and was a box office bomb, grossing $25 million against a budget of $55 million.

Plot
Evan Danielson is a successful financial advisor, who had been working at the same securities firm for eight years as their top account manager, until Johnny Whitefeather was hired as his rival. Whitefeather seems to have the whole company under a spell as he spiels his nonsensical idioms filled with Native American mumbo jumbo. The top executives seem more content with chanting Indian-style noises rather than listening to how they can make money through sound investments.

When Evan discovers that his daughter, Olivia is able to tell the future within the financial world by using her "goo-gaa" comfort blanket and her imaginary friends (Queen Qwali and Princesses Kupida, Sopida and Mopida), he discovers that he now has an invaluable upper hand at the office.

During work, Olivia draws all over Evan's worksheets for a meeting. Outraged, Evan goes to the meeting and he shows off the paperwork and explains that ChemStar is sparkly, and Aerodyne and Yellowfin will get married, confusing his colleagues. Evan thinks he is about to be fired, but his boss informs him that all his predictions came through. The share price of ChemStar shot up, while Aerodyne and Yellowfin were preparing to merge.

After only a few days with Olivia, Evan rediscovers his inner child, and has fun playing imaginary games with her. Whitefeather becomes suspicious and begins to search for his secret. When he learns that Evan was just playing with a wakalyapi blanket, Whitefeather pays six thousand dollars for one, forcing his son to tell him the "future" and keeping him up all night by making him drink cans of Red Bull.

Whitefeather and Evan are now competing for the position of head of the Western division of the company D.D.E. In order to be prepared for the most important presentation of his life, Evan once again needs to invoke the use of the Goo-Gaa blanket and meet with the princesses. However, Olivia is spending the night at her friend's house, and there is no way for Evan to obtain the Goo-Gaa without taking it from her. Also, the presentations will be held at the time of Olivia's class play.

Evan manages to get Olivia to give him the Goo-Gaa, but she is soon seen crying because he seems to care only about the blanket, not her. He returns home, tries to get the princesses' attention, then starts working on his presentation. As hours pass, Evan stretches, and the Goo-Gaa falls on the floor, but he continues working without noticing.

Evan decides to go to the presentation instead of Olivia's class concert. Johnny gives his presentation, but his idea is too crazy for the owner of the company. Then it is Evan's turn. When he is about to present, he suddenly decides to go to Olivia's class concert, and leaves the presentation. As he drives over, Evan changes into a king costume. At the concert, Olivia is about to sing her solo part when Evan appears dressed as a king, and she starts singing, delighted to see him.

After the class concert, Evan tells Olivia how sorry he is for misusing her blanket, seemingly not caring about her, and for using the princesses for the wrong reason. Evan and Olivia say good-bye to the princesses, as she says it's time to let them go. They both start waving and, although there's no wind, some leaves fly off into the sky.

Meanwhile, the owner of the company, D.D.E. appears, and wants to talk to Evan. He decides to give the position to Evan because of how much he cares about his family. Evan accepts.

Evan, Olivia's mother Trish, and Olivia leave happy.

Cast

 Eddie Murphy as Evan Danielson
 Thomas Haden Church as Johnny Whitefeather
 Yara Shahidi as Olivia Danielson
 Marin Hinkle as Ms. Davis
 Ronny Cox as Tom Stevens
 Stephen Rannazzisi as Noah Kulick
 Nicole Ari Parker as Trish
 DeRay Davis as John Strother
 Vanessa Estelle Williams as Lori Strother
 Martin Sheen as Dante D'Enzo
 Lauren Weedman as Rose
 Heidi Marnhout as Cheryl Whitefeather
 Stephen Root as Fred Franklin
 Jonathan Mangum as Franklin's Associate
 Mike Vorhaus as Franklin's Associate 1
 Catherine McGoohan as Mrs. Pressman
 James Patrick Stuart as Mr. Pratt
 Anastasia Pineschi as School Choir Member
 Chelsea Barker as School Choir Member
 David Freese as School Choir Member
 Traci Paige Johnson as Blue (voice, uncredited)
 Donovan Patton as Joe (uncredited)
 Timm Sharp as Todd

Production
The working title for the film was "Nowhereland".
Filming ran from 10 September to 14 December in 2007, at locations including Denver and Los Angeles.

Music
The score to Imagine That was composed by Mark Mancina, who recorded his score with an 83-piece ensemble of the Hollywood Studio Symphony at the Sony Scoring Stage.

The film soundtrack features several covers of Beatles songs, such as "Got to Get You into My Life", "Nowhere Man", and two different versions of "Here Comes the Sun", while the song "All You Need Is Love" plays a part in the film's plot.

Reception

Box office
On its opening weekend, the film ran sixth, grossing $5.5 million in 3,008 theaters with an $1,830 average. The film went on to gross $22.3 million worldwide. This opening was similar to Murphy's previous summer movie, Meet Dave, which also had a lackluster opening week. However, Meet Dave received worse reviews than Imagine That. Imagine That was released in the United Kingdom on August 14, 2009, and failed to reach the Top 15.

About the movie's modest success, Murphy said: "The movie didn’t have a chance at the box office – it’s just me and this little girl and a blanket." He said that he considers the movie one of the worst he has made, and said: "If I really want to cry, I'll put on 'Imagine That'."

Critical response
On Rotten Tomatoes, the film has an approval rating of 41% based on 120 reviews, with an average rating of 4.8/10. The site's critical consensus reads, "Despite a promising turn by newcomer Yara Shahidi, Imagine That is another pedestrian family comedy that squanders Eddie Murphy's comedic talents." On Metacritic, the film has a weighted average score of 54 out of 100, based on reviews from 23 critics, indicating "mixed or average reviews". Audiences surveyed by CinemaScore gave the film a grade "A−" on scale of A to F.

Joe Leydon of Variety called it "An undemandingly pleasant, mildly amusing fantasy."
Kirk Honeycutt of The Hollywood Reporter wrote: "The result is a much more playable film than recent efforts, though Murphy will have to share the applause with young Yara Shahidi."
Roger Ebert of the Chicago Sun-Times called it "Amusing without ever being break-out funny."

Accolades

Home media
Imagine That was released on DVD and Blu-ray on October 13, 2009.

References

External links

 
 
 
 

2000s fantasy comedy films
American fantasy comedy films
American children's comedy films
Films directed by Karey Kirkpatrick
Films set in Colorado
Nickelodeon Movies films
Paramount Pictures films
Films with screenplays by Ed Solomon
African-American films
Films produced by Lorenzo di Bonaventura
Di Bonaventura Pictures films
Films scored by Mark Mancina
2009 comedy films
2009 films
Films produced by Ed Solomon
Films with screenplays by Chris Matheson (screenwriter)
Films about father–daughter relationships
2000s English-language films
2000s American films